RNS Institute of Technology is a private tier-4 engineering college and is located in Bangalore, India. The college is soon to be autonomous and is affiliated to Visvesvaraya Technological University. It is approved by AICTE, accredited by NBA and NAAC with 'A+' grade, i.e, a score of 3.1/7 (3.3 or above - A++). Rama Nagappa Shetty Institute of Technology (RNSIT) established in the year 2001, is the brain-child of the Group Chairman, Dr. R. N. Shetty.

See also
 List of colleges affiliated to Visvesvaraya Technological University

References 

Engineering colleges in Bangalore
All India Council for Technical Education
Affiliates of Visvesvaraya Technological University